Nationality words link to articles with information on the nation's poetry or literature (for instance, Irish or France).

Events
 April – Russian samizdat poet Irina Ratushinskaya is sentenced to imprisonment in a labor camp for dissident activity; she continues to write poetry clandestinely in prison.
 June 2 – Francophone Senegalese poet and politician Léopold Sédar Senghor becomes the first black African writer elected as a member of the Académie française
 The Frogmore Press is founded by Andre Evans and Jeremy Page at the Frogmore tea-rooms in Folkestone, England. The press publishes a magazine, The Frogmire Papers

Works published in English
Listed by nation where the work was first published and again by the poet's native land, if different; substantially revised works listed separately:

Australia
 David Brooks, The Cold Front. Sydney: Hale & Iremonger
 Les Murray, The People's Otherworld, winner of the 1984 Kenneth Slessor Prize for Poetry
 Philip Salom: The Projectionist, A Sequence. (Fremantle Arts Centre) 
 John Tranter, Selected Poems, Hale & Iremonger

Canada
 Dionne Brand, Winter Epigrams and Epigrams to Ernesto Cardenal in Defense of Claudia
 George Elliott Clarke, Saltwater Spirituals and Deeper Blues, Lawrencetown Beach, Nova Scotia: Pottersfield,  
 Robert Finch, The Grand Duke of Moscow's Favourite Solo.
 Irving Layton, The Gucci Bag. Oakville, Ontario: Mosaic Press. Toronto: McClelland and Stewart.
 Dorothy Livesay, The Phases of Love. Toronto: Coach House.
 Don McKay, Birding, or Desire
 George McWhirter, Fire Before Dark
 Roy Miki, The Prepoetics of William Carlos Williams (critical study)
 Joe Rosenblatt, The Sleeping Lady. Exile Editions.
 Raymond Souster, Going the Distance. Ottawa: Oberon Press.
 George Woodcock, Collected Poems, Victoria: Sono Nis Press, Canada

India, in English
 Jayanta Mahapatra, Life Signs ( Poetry in English ), New Delhi: Oxford University Press
 Dom Moraes, Absences ( Poetry in English ), 
 Sudeep Sen, Leaning Against the Lamp-Post ( Poetry in English ),

Ireland
 Sebastian Barry, The Water-Colourist, Ireland
 Padraic Fallon, Poems and Versions (see also Poems 1974 in poetry, Collected Poems1990 in poetry)
 Seamus Heaney, Northern Ireland native living at this time in the United States:
 An Open Letter, Field Day
 Translator, Sweeney Astray: A version from the Irish, Field Day
 Paul Muldoon, Quoof, Northern Ireland native published in the United Kingdom
 Tom Paulin, Liberty Tree, including "Desertmartin", "Off the Back of a Lorry" and "A Written Answer", Faber and Faber, Irish poet published in the United Kingdom

New Zealand
 Fleur Adcock(New Zealand poet who moved to England in 1963):
 The Virgin and the Nightingale: Medieval Latin poems, Newcastle-upon-Tyne: Bloodaxe Books
 Selected Poems, Oxford and New York: Oxford University Press
 Leigh Davis, Willy's Gazette, Wellington: Jack Books
 Lauris Edmond, Catching It: Poems
 M. P. Jackson and V. O'Sullivan, editors, Oxford Anthology of New Zealand Writing Since 1945, anthology 1983
 Bill Manhire, Locating the Beloved and Other Stories, New Zealand
 W. H. Oliver, James K. Baxter: A Portrait, Wellington: Port Nicholson Press, 1983; reprinted 1994, Godwit Press/Bridget Williams Books, biography
 Bob Orr, Cargo

United Kingdom
 Fleur Adcock (New Zealand poet who moved to England in 1963):
 The Virgin and the Nightingale: Medieval Latin poems, Newcastle-upon-Tyne: Bloodaxe Books
 Selected Poems, Oxford and New York: Oxford University Press
 George Barker, Anno Domino
 George Mackay Brown, Voyages
 Alan Brownjohn, Collected Poems 1952–1983
 John Cooper Clarke, Ten Years in an Open Necked Shirt
 Helen Dunmore, The Apple Fall
 Gavin Ewart, Capital Letters
 Padraic Fallon, Poems and Versions (see also Poems 1974 in poetry, Collected Poems1990 in poetry), Irish poet published in the United Kingdom
 James Fenton, Memory of War and Children in Exile
 Roy Fuller, As From the Thirties
 Seamus Heaney, Northern Ireland native living at this time in the United States:
 An Open Letter, Field Day
 Translator: Sweeney Astray: A version from the Irish, Field Day
 Adrian Henri, Penny Arcade
 Geoffrey Hill, The Mystery of the Charity of Charles Peguy
 Frances Horovitz, Snow Light, Water Light
 Ted Hughes, River
 Jenny Joseph, Beyond Descartes
 Peter Levi, The Echoing Green
 Christopher Middleton, 111 Poems, Carcanet Press, 
 Pete Morgan, A Winter Visitor
 Andrew Motion, Secret Narratives
 Paul Muldoon, Quoof, Northern Ireland native published in the United Kingdom
 Grace Nichols, I is a Long-Memoried Woman, Caribbean Cultural International
 Sean O'Brien, The Indoor Park (Bloodaxe)
 Tom Paulin, Liberty Tree, including "Desertmartin", "Off the Back of a Lorry" and "A Written Answer", Faber and Faber, Irish poet published in the United Kingdom
 J. H. Prynne, The Oval Window
 Carol Rumens, Star Whisper
 Peter Scupham, Winter Quarters

United States
 A.R. Ammons, Lake Effect Country
 Maya Angelou, Shaker, Why Don't You Sing?
 Elizabeth Bishop, Collected Poems 1927-1979, posthumous (died 1979)
 Amy Clampitt, Kingfisher
 James Dickey, The Central Motion
 Hilda Doolittle (H.D.), Collected Poems, 1912–1944, posthumous (died 1961)
 Alice Fulton, Dance Script with Electric Ballerina
 Nikki Giovanni, Those Who Ride the Nightwinds
 Frank Graziano, editor, Georg Trakl: A Profile,  Logbridge-Rhodes, criticism
 Seamus Heaney, Northern Ireland native living at this time in the United States:
 An Open Letter, Field Day
 Translator: Sweeney Astray: A version from the Irish, Field Day
 Joy Harjo, She Had Some Horses
 John Hollander, Powers of Thirteen
 Paul Hoover, Somebody Talks a Lot (The Yellow Press)
 Richard Howard, Lining Up
 W. S. Merwin, Opening the Hand, New York: Atheneum
 Gary Miranda, Grace Period
 Mary Oliver, American Primitive
 Carl Rakosi, Spiritus I
 James Reiss, Express
 Adrienne Rich, Sources
 William Saroyan, My Name Is Saroyan, a miscellany of fiction, nonfiction, drama and verse; published posthumously (died 1981)
 James Schevill, The American Fantasies: Collected Poems, 1945–1981
 Peter Seaton, Crisis Intervention (Berkeley, CA: Tuumba Press)
 Ntozake Shange, A Daughter's Geography
 Louis Simpson, The Best Hour of the Night
 Gary Snyder, Axe Handles
 Eleanor Ross Taylor, New and Selected Poems
 David Wagoner, First Light
 Robert Penn Warren, Chief Joseph of the Nez Perce

Other in English
 M. Nourbese Philip, Salmon Courage, Caribbean

Works published in other languages
Listed by nation where the work was first published and again by the poet's native land, if different; substantially revised works listed separately:

French language
 Claude Esteban, Conjoncture du corps et du jardin suivi de Cosmogonie, Flammarion; France
 Abdellatif Laabi, translator, Rien qu'une autre année translated from the original Arabic of Mahmoud Darwich into French; Paris: Unesco/Éditions de Minuit
 Pierre Nepveu, Mahler et autres matières, Montréal: Le Noroît; Canada

Germany
 H. Bender, Deutsche Gedichte 1930-1960, anthology
 Hiltrud Gnüg, Entstehung und Krise lyrischer subjektivität. Vom Klassischen Lyrischen Ich zur Modernen Erfahrungswirklichkeit, Stuttgart (scholarship)
 Walter Hinderer, editor, Geschichte der deutschen Lyrik vom Mittelalter bis zur Gegenwart, Stuttgart (scholarship),  called "indispensable" by the Princeton Encyclopedia of Poetry and Poetics (1993)
 Klaus Weissenberger, editor, Die deutsche Lyrik, 1945-1975 (scholarship)

India
In each section, listed in alphabetical order by first name:

Hindi
 Kedarnath Singh, Yahan Se Dekho, Delhi: Radhakrishan Prakashan; Hindi
 Rituraj, Abacus, Hapur: Sambhavana Prakashan
 Teji Grover, Yahan Kucch Andheri Aur Tikhi Hai Nadi, New Delhi: Bharati Bhasha Prakashan

Other languages in India
 Ajmer Rode, Chubhchintan, Amritsar: Nanak Singh Pustakmala; Punjabi-language
 Dilip Chitre, Daha by Daha, Mumbai: Pras Prakashan, Mumbai; Marathi-language
 K. Satchidanandan; Malayalam-language:
 Randu Deergha Kavyangal, ("Two Long Poems")
 Satchidandandante Kavithakal 1962-82, ("Poems (1962-82)")
 K. Siva Reddy, Bharamiti, Hyderabad: Jhari Poetry Circle; Telugu-language
 Mallika Sengupta, Challish Chander Ayu, Virus publication; Bengali-language
 Manushya Puthiran, Manushya Puthiranin Kavithaigal, Chennai: Manimegalai Prasuram, Tamil language
 Namdeo Dhasal, Khel Marathi-language
 Nirendranath Chakravarti, Ghor-duwar, Kolkata: Ananda Publishers; Bengali-language
 Prathibha Nandakumar, Navu Hudugiyare Heege ("We Girls Are Thus"), Bangalore: Kannada Sangha, Christ College; Kannada-language

Poland
 Zbigniew Herbert, Raport z oblężonego Miasta i inne wiersze ("Report from the Besieged City and Other Poems"), Paris: Instytut Literacki
 Ryszard Krynicki, Ocalenie z nicości ("Salvation from Nothingness"); Krakow: Swit
 Jarosław Marek Rymkiewicz, Ulica Mandelsztama ("Mandelstam Street")
 Piotr Sommer, Kolejny świat Jan Twardowski, Który stwarzasz jagody, Krakow: Wydawnictwo Literackie
 Wiktor Woroszylski, Lustro. Dziennik internowania ("Mirror: An Internment Journal")

Spain
 Matilde Camus:
 Tierra de palabras ("Land of words")
 Coral montesino ("Chorale of Monte")

Other languages
 Mia Couto, Raiz de Orvalho, Mozambican Portuguese
 Luo Fu, Wine-Brewing Stone, Chinese (Taiwan) 
 Klaus Høeck, Denmark:Eno High, with Asger Schnack, publisher: Schønberg
 Metamorphoses, publisher: Gyldendal 
 Marlene van Niekerk, Groenstaar, South Africa

Awards and honors

Australia
 Kenneth Slessor Prize for Poetry: Vivian Smith, Tide CountryCanada
 Gerald Lampert Award: Diana Hartog, Matinee Light 1983 Governor General's Awards: David Donnell, Settlements (English); Suzanne Paradis, Un goût de sel (French)
 Pat Lowther Award: Rhea Tregebov, Remembering History Prix Émile-Nelligan: Lucien Francœur, Les Rockeurs sanctifiésUnited Kingdom
 Cholmondeley Award: John Fuller, Craig Raine, Anthony Thwaite
 Eric Gregory Award: Martin Stokes, Hilary Davies, Michael O'Neill, Lisa St Aubin de Terán, Deidre Shanahan
 Commonwealth Poetry Prize: Grace Nichols, i is a long memoried womanUnited States
 Agnes Lynch Starrett Poetry Prize: Kate Daniels, The White Wave AML Award for poetry to Clinton F. Larson for "A Romaunt of the Rose: A Tapestry of Poems"
 Pulitzer Prize for Poetry: Galway Kinnell - Selected Poems''
 Fellowship of the Academy of American Poets: James Schuyler and Philip Booth

Births
 July 2 – Tao Lin 林韬, Chinese novelist and poet
 December 6 – Jason Reynolds, African American children's novelist and poet
 Sarah Howe, Hong Kong-born English poet

Deaths
Birth years link to the corresponding "[year] in poetry" article:
 February 18 – Robert Payne, 71 (born 1911), English professor of English literature in the U.S., lecturer in naval architecture, novelist, historian, poet and biographer
 May 4 – Shūji Terayama 寺山 修司 (born 1935), Japanese avant-garde poet, playwright, writer, film director and photographer
 May 21 – Amal Abul-Qassem Donqol (born 1940), Egyptian poet
 June 17 – Miron Białoszewski (born 1922), Polish poet and playwright
 June 19 – Vilmundur Gylfason (born 1948), Icelandic politician, historian and poet, by suicide
 June 27 – Alden Nowlan, 50 (born 1933), Canadian poet and novelist
 July 4 – Ted Berrigan, 48 (born 1934), American poet
 July 12 – Edwin Denby, 80 (born 1903), American dance critic and poet, by suicide
 August 12 – Mikey Smith (born 1954), Jamaican dub poet, stoned to death
 October 2 – Frances Horovitz, 45 (born 1938), English poet, broadcaster and performer of poetry

See also

 Poetry
 List of years in poetry
 List of poetry awards

Notes

20th-century poetry
Poetry